Thaali is a 1997 Indian Telugu-language drama film, produced by Maganti Venkateswara Rao under the MRC Movie Creations banner and directed by E. V. V. Satyanarayana. It stars Srikanth, Swetha, Sneha and Swathi, with music composed by Vidyasagar. The film was a box office hit.

Plot 
The film begins on Bose Babu (Srikanth) a wealthy person in a village one that is a tough nut to his opponent Kota (Kota Srinivasa Rao). So, for a thwart, Kota plans to couple up his daughter Swathi (Swathi) with Bose Babu. At that moment, he knows that Bose Babu's alliance is already fixed with his father's close friend Ramaraju's (Murali Mohan) daughter Sneha (Sneha). Just after, Bose Babu secretly visits Ramaraju's house where he misjudges Ganga (Swetha) his foster daughter as the bride. Indeed, Ganga is an orphan brought by Ramaraju along with his daughter. Being cognizant of her wedlock, Sneha rejects as she holds a beau Sivaji (Srihari) Kota's son. Right now, angered Ramaraju forcibly couples her with Bose Babu. During the wedding, the duo overlooks each other. Thereupon, Sneha removes the Thaali the wedding chain and elopes. Spotting it, Ramaraju collapses when to keep him at save face his trustworthy servant Ramu (Rajendra Prasad) requests and puts Ganga on the front who wears the wedding chain and lands at Bose Babu's residence. Soon after his recovery, Ramu subterfuges Ramaraju that Sneha is safe and proceeded to her in-law's house.

Meanwhile, Sneha discovers Sivaji as a swindler when he knocks her out. Simultaneously, in the village, Bose Babu tries to get nearer Ganga, but she disregards him. Suddenly, one day, Ramaraju reaches the village and learns the truth when he proclaims Ganga as Bose Bose's official wife and recouples them. Thereafter, Bose Babu & Ganga start their new life and she becomes pregnant. Here as a flabbergast, Bose Babu appears with Sneha claiming her as his wife. Now Bose Babu divulges the reality that once he encountered a seriously injured girl and admitted her in the hospital affirming as his wife. But sadly she is affected by amnesia, so, he brought her home. After a few comic incidents, Ganga leaves the house returning the wedding chain to Sneha and Ramu too, escorts her. Immediately, Bose Babu rushes, when he realizes the actuality. Meanwhile, Kota & Sivaji notices Ganga & Ramu and falsifies their relationship when watching Sivaji, Sneha regains her memory. During that plight, Ramaraju arrives and imparts the facts. By the time, Ganga gives birth to a baby boy and Bose Babu brings her back. At last, everyone professes Ganga as Bose Babu's wife. Finally, the movie ends on a happy note by Bose Babu again tying the wedding chain to Ganga.

Cast 
Srikanth as Bose Babu
Swetha as Ganga
Sneha as Sneha
Swathi as Swathi
Rajendra Prasad as Ramu
Murali Mohan as Ramaraju
Srihari as Shivaji
Kota Srinivasa Rao as Kota
Brahmanandam as Suri Rao
Mallikarjuna Rao
Srividya as Seetaratnam

Soundtrack 

Music composed by Vidyasagar. The song "Guntalakaddi" was reused from composer's own track "Dheemtha Thakita" which he had composed for Tamil film Villadhi villain.

Awards
Nandi Award for Best Choreographer - Tharun Master

References

External links 

1997 films
1990s Telugu-language films
Indian drama films
Films directed by E. V. V. Satyanarayana
Films scored by Vidyasagar
Telugu films remade in other languages
1997 drama films